The Manawatu Turbos are the Air New Zealand Cup team of the Manawatu Rugby Union.

Current squad

Squad changes

In

Out

Matches

References

New Zealand rugby union teams
Sport in Palmerston North
2008 in New Zealand rugby union